Heriot-Watt University Dubai Campus is a satellite campus of Heriot-Watt University based in Dubai, United Arab Emirates. Established in 2005, it was the first campus of an overseas university to open in Dubai International Academic City.

In April 2019, Heriot-Watt's Dubai campus was crowned 'Best University' in the Middle East at the first ever Forbes Middle East Higher Education Awards.

The campus received a five-star rating for three consecutive years in 2019, 2020 and 2021 from the Knowledge and Human Development Authority (KHDA), the supreme educational quality assurance and regulatory authority of the Government of Dubai.

In 2021, the university reallocated its Dubai campus location to Dubai Knowledge Park.

History

Heriot-Watt University Dubai Campus opened initially in 2005 at the Dubai International Academic City University Complex. It originally started with 120 students, with plans to increase the number to 1,500 students within a 5-year time frame. However, the pace of its expansion outstripped this projection, and by 2010 it had reached its original capacity of 2,000 students.

Construction of Heriot-Watt University's purpose-built campus in Dubai International Academic City began in 2010. This state of the art campus officially opened on 3 November 2011, increasing the capacity of Heriot-Watt Dubai Campus to 4,500 students.

In 2013 Heriot-Watt University Dubai Campus opened its phase 2 campus extension boasting a 700-seater auditorium, male and female onsite accommodation, food court, gymnasium, indoor games room, food court, convenience store, and beauty salon.

As one of Dubai's most successful international higher education providers, the student population has now grown to 3,700, with students from more than 90 different countries studying at the campus.

Campus and Campus Life

Heriot-Watt University Dubai Campus is located on the Academic City Road in Dubai International Academic City, approximately 20 minutes from the city's business district. Phase 1 of the campus consists of a three-floor building containing of numerous classrooms, IT lab facilities, mechanical, automotive, civil and electrical and electronic engineering labs, a library and fashion and interior design studios, in addition to outdoor sports facilities including basketball, tennis and volleyball courts.

Phase 2 of the Campus offers a wider variety of facilities for the students, including a 700-seat auditorium, an indoor games room, a food court, a gymnasium, a convenience store, a quiet study area for students to use and onsite male and female student accommodation.

At the Dubai Campus, students work in a supportive and positive learning environment that will ensure they can make the best of their time at the university. A range of support services are offered, with friendly and approachable staff who are able to provide students with the advice, support and information they need.

Guaranteed tuition fee packages, interest free installment plans and opportunities for scholarships are also available to support students in the financing of their degrees.

Student activities and events are organized by the Student Council in collaboration with the student body at Heriot-Watt University. The Student Council is headed by the Student President who is elected on an annual basis by Heriot-Watt University Dubai Campus Students. The Student Council makes the major decisions regarding student activities. These include the annual Watt Fest, International Days, Scottish Highland Games, charity drives, picnics etc.

Courses

One of the first higher education providers to be licensed by the Knowledge and Human Development Authority in Dubai (KHDA), Heriot-Watt's degrees are also accredited by royal charter in the UK. While the campus initially offered business, management, engineering and information technology programmes, it now offers more than 50 undergraduate and postgraduate (Master's degree and PhD) programmes across the following schools:

 The School of Energy, Geoscience, Infrastructure and Society
 The School of Engineering and Physical Sciences
 The School of Social Sciences
 The School of Mathematical and Computer Sciences
 The School of Textiles and Design
 The Edinburgh Business School

At the Dubai Campus, students gain a degree that is taught and examined to the same exacting standards as on the university's UK campuses. All of the programmes are taught by Heriot-Watt's own faculty, the majority of whom are permanently located in Dubai, supplemented by visiting experts in key fields.

With strong links to industry and business, the university takes pride in developing and educating future leaders, managers and innovators. With many of the programmes on offer recognised by the relevant professional associations and institutes, a Heriot-Watt University degree is professionally valued and Heriot-Watt graduates are highly sought after by employers. Many of the university's 77,000 alumni are working in key positions. Graduates also have the benefit of 'Watt Club' membership. This offers social events and networking opportunities.

One unusual feature of many of the degree programmes is the option of inter-campus transfers to Heriot-Watt University's other campuses. Under the banner of the 'Go Global' scheme, students who commence their studies with Heriot-Watt University in Dubai can choose to spend a semester or a year at the one or more of the university's other campuses in Scotland or Malaysia. Students starting courses in Scotland or Malaysia can also transfer to Dubai. This is possible because Heriot-Watt University degree programmes are exactly the same at each campus.

See also

 Heriot-Watt University
 List of universities in the United Arab Emirates
 Education in Dubai

References

External links
Heriot-Watt University
Heriot-Watt University: Dubai study

Universities and colleges in Dubai
Heriot-Watt University
2005 establishments in the United Arab Emirates
Educational institutions established in 2005
Dubai International Academic City